Hans-Georg Anscheidt (born 23 December 1935 at Königsberg) is a retired German Grand Prix motorcycle road racing World Champion. He won three consecutive FIM 50 cc world championships from 1966 to 1968 as a member of the Suzuki factory racing team.

References

German motorcycle racers
50cc World Championship riders
125cc World Championship riders
Isle of Man TT riders
1935 births
Living people
Place of birth missing (living people)
Sportspeople from Königsberg